The 2014 Tour de France was the 101st edition of the race, one of cycling's Grand Tours. The  race included 21 stages, starting in Leeds, United Kingdom, on 5 July and finishing on the Champs-Élysées in Paris on 27 July.

The race was contested by 22 teams. All of the eighteen UCI ProTeams were automatically invited, and obliged, to attend the race. The team presentation – where the members of each team's roster are introduced in front of the media and local dignitaries – took place at the First Direct Arena in Leeds, United Kingdom, on 3 July, two days before the opening stage held in the city. The riders arrived at the arena by a ceremonial ride from the University of Leeds. The event included performances from Embrace and Opera North in front of an audience of 10,000.

Each squad was allowed a maximum of nine riders, therefore the start list contained a total of 198 riders. Of these, 47 were riding the Tour de France for the first time. The total number of riders that finished the race was 174. The riders came from 34 countries; France, Spain, Italy, Netherlands, Germany, Australia and Belgium all had 10 or more riders in the race. 's Ji Cheng was the first Chinese rider to participate in the Tour. Riders from eight countries won stages during the race; German riders won the largest number of stages, with seven. The average age of riders in the race was 29.88 years, ranging from the 20-year-old Danny van Poppel to the 42-year-old Jens Voigt, both  riders. Voigt, riding in his final year as a professional, equalled Stuart O'Grady's record for most appearances in the Tour with 17.  had the highest average age, while  had the lowest.

He lost it after the next stage to Vincenzo Nibali, who won the stage. Nibali held the race lead until the end of the ninth stage, when it was taken by 's Tony Gallopin. The yellow jersey returned to Nibali the following stage, and he held it until the conclusion of the race. Second and third respectively were Jean-Christophe Péraud and Thibaut Pinot. The points classification was won by Peter Sagan of the  team. Rafał Majka, winner of two mountain stages, won the mountains classification. Alessandro De Marchi was given the award for the most combative rider.

Teams

UCI ProTeams

  (riders)
  (riders)
  (riders)
  (riders)
  (riders)
  (riders)
  (riders)
  (riders)
  (riders)
  (riders)
  (riders)
  (riders)
  (riders)
  (riders)
  (riders)
  (riders)
  (riders)
  (riders)

UCI Professional Continental teams

  (riders)
  (riders)
  (riders)
  (riders)

Cyclists

By starting number

By team

By nationality

References

Sources

External links

 

2014 Tour de France
2014